Lafnitz is a municipality in the district of Hartberg-Fürstenfeld in Styria, Austria. It is situated on the upper course of the river Lafnitz.

References

Cities and towns in Hartberg-Fürstenfeld District